The White Steel was a steel guitar made by the Fender company. It was released as a student model in 1956 and was sold with the matching amplifier.

Electrics
Each neck had two single-coil pickups. These could be blended by a small wheel attached to a pot that sat just behind the bridge, introduced in 1956. The bridge pick-up was always on, and the neck pickup could be fed in to taste using the blend pot. Because the pickups were wired with reversed polarities, blending in the neck pickup caused the pickups to be "hum-bucking". A neck selector switch controlled which neck's pickups were 'live'. On earlier 1950s models, the neck selector was controlled by push-buttons. A single tone and a single volume control served the entire instrument.

Scale lengths
The original 1956 models had a long scale length, at 26". From 1964 the scale length was reduced, and two shorter lengths were available, 24.5" and 22.5", both with 31 frets. To determine the guitar's scale count the markers past the 24th fret; there are 2, 3, and 4 markers for the 22.5", 24.5", and 26" guitars respectively.

References

Fender electric guitars